Jean-Luc Godard (1930–2022) was a French-Swiss filmmaker.

Godard may also refer to:

 Godard (surname), includes a list of people with the surname
 "Godard", composition from the compilation album Godard/Spillane by John Zorn

See also 

 Saint Godard (disambiguation)
 Goddard (disambiguation)
 Gotthard (disambiguation)